The phleophagan chestnut moth (Ectoedemia phleophaga) was a species of moth in the family Nepticulidae. It was endemic to the United States, where it was known from Virginia.

Description
The wingspan is 9–10 mm. Adults were on wing during September.

Breeding
The larvae live in the lower layer of the bark of chestnut just above and encroaching upon the cambium. The mine is slender and serpentine, often doubling upon itself and broadening out to twice or more in width in early spring, when the larva reaches maturity. Full-grown larvae leave the bark and fall to the ground where they makes a closely woven, reddish brown cocoon amongst the rubbish, often boring down a few inches in the loose surface soil to find a suitable moist place on the underside of an old leaf or twig. The cocoon is oval and flattened,

Ecology
It was regarded as an important factor in the spread of chestnut blight.

References

Sources
Nepticulidae of North America
 

Nepticulidae
Natural history of Virginia
Moths described in 1914
Endemic fauna of the United States
Moths of North America
Extinct insects since 1500
Taxonomy articles created by Polbot